Ruwer is a Verbandsgemeinde (collective municipality) with 18,171 inhabitants (as at Dec 2015) on the river Ruwer near Trier in Rhineland-Palatinate, Germany. It is famous for the wine from the Moselle wine-growing region, which used to be called Moselle-Saar-Ruwer, and which was founded by the Romans. The administrative seat used to be located in Ruwer, which was an independent municipality until it was incorporated into the city of Trier. The seat has been located in Waldrach since November 2005.

Ruwer consists of the following 20 Ortsgemeinden ("local municipalities"): 

The Verbandsgemeinde Ruwer is a part of the district  Trier-Saarburg.

Gallery

See also
 Ruwer-Hochwald-Radweg

References

External links

 Homepage of the municipality
 Touristinformation Ruwer

Verbandsgemeinde in Rhineland-Palatinate